Liubov Manucharovna Kemularia-Nathadze (February 14, 1891 – February 19, 1985) was a Georgian botanist noted for collecting and describing plants of Georgia.

References 

1891 births
1985 deaths
20th-century botanists
People from Kutais Governorate
Tbilisi State University alumni
Honoured Scientists of Georgia (country)
Recipients of the Order of Lenin
Recipients of the Order of the Red Banner of Labour
Botanists from Georgia (country)
Botanists with author abbreviations
Georgian women scientists
Soviet botanists
Soviet women scientists